3110 may refer to:

In general
 A.D. 3110, a year in the 4th millennium CE
 3110 BC, a year in the 4th millennium BCE
 3110, a number in the 3000 (number) range

Other uses
 3110 Wagman, an asteroid in the Asteroid Belt, the 3110th asteroid registered
 Nokia 3110, a cellphone
 Nokia 3110 classic, a cellphone
 Texas Farm to Market Road 3110, a state highway

See also